The Smith, later Dodsworth, later Smith-Dodsworth Baronetcy, of Newland Park in the County of York, is a title in the Baronetage of Great Britain. It was created on 22 January 1784 for John Silvester Smith, of Newland Park, Yorkshire. He married Henrietta, daughter of John Dodsworth, of Thornton Watlass Hall, Yorkshire, and sister and heiress of Frederick Dodsworth. The second Baronet assumed in 1821 by Royal licence the surname of Dodsworth in lieu of his patronymic. The fourth Baronet assumed the surname of Smith-Dodsworth.

The Dodsworth family is descended from Lionel, Duke of Clarence, third son of King Edward III and Philippa of Hainault. The Thornton Watlass estate was acquired in 1415 by Thomas Dodsworth. Sir Edward Dodsworth, Commissary-General to the Parliamentary Army, Matthew Dodsworth and the antiquary Roger Dodsworth were later members of the family.

The family seat is Thornton Watlass Hall, near Thornton Watlass, Yorkshire.

Smith, later Dodsworth, later Smith-Dodsworth baronets, of Newland Park (1784)

Sir John Silvester Smith, 1st Baronet (1734–1789)
Sir Edward Dodsworth, 2nd Baronet (1768–1845)
Sir Charles Dodsworth, 3rd Baronet (1775–1857)
Sir Matthew Smith-Dodsworth, 4th Baronet (1819–1858)
Sir Charles Edward Smith-Dodsworth, 5th Baronet (1853–1891)
Sir Matthew Blayney Smith-Dodsworth, 6th Baronet (1856–1931)
Sir Claude Matthew Smith-Dodsworth, 7th Baronet (1888–1940)
Sir John Christopher Smith-Dodsworth, 8th Baronet (1935–2012)
Sir David John Smith-Dodsworth, 9th Baronet (born 1963)

The heir apparent is the present holder's only son Matthew David Smith-Dodsworth (born 2002).

Notes

References 
Kidd, Charles, Williamson, David (editors). Debrett's Peerage and Baronetage (1990 edition). New York: St Martin's Press, 1990, 
Brief history of the Smith-Dodsworth family

Smith-Dodsworth
1784 establishments in Great Britain